Randall W. "Randy" Pike (September 30, 1953 – September 20, 2014) was an American politician.

Born in Butler, Missouri, Pike graduated from Butler High School in 1972 and then went to Central Missouri State University. Pike was a taxidermist and wood carver. He was elected Bates County, Missouri Northern Commissioner and served from 2002 to 2012. Pike then served in the Missouri House of Representatives, as a Republican, from Adrian, Missouri from 2013 until his death in 2014 in Butler, ten days before his 61st birthday.

Notes

1953 births
2014 deaths
People from Butler, Missouri
University of Central Missouri alumni
County commissioners in Missouri
Republican Party members of the Missouri House of Representatives
People from Adrian, Missouri